Heart FM is a 2008 Sri Lankan Sinhala family drama film directed by Senesh Dissanaike Bandara and produced by Soma Edirisinghe for EAP Films. It stars Gayan Wickramathillaka, Kanchana Mendis and Sachini Ayendra in lead roles along with Aruna Liyan and Mahendra Perera. Music co-composed by Centigradz and Nawarathne Gamage. EAP Group also celebrated 50th anniversary of E.A.P. films with the production of this film. It is the 1099th Sri Lankan film in the Sinhala cinema.

Plot

The story unravels that it is a person's qualities, not their looks that count. It is centered on three main characters, Shakya (Sachini Ayendra), a daughter of a politician, her sister Mandakini a.k.a Mandy (Kanchana Mendis) and Rajiv, a young DJ working at a radio station (Gayan Wickramatileke). Shakya encounters Rajiv via 'Home Delivery' a song request programme.

Rajiv is touched by Shakya's tale of woe, a tale she relates by taking on a new identity - that of her sister's. Rajiv peruses the real Mandakini believing she is the one who continues to phone him. Finally the big day arrives with Rajiv encountering Mandakini. Day breaks with a close relationship forming between the duo.

Then the story takes two unexpected turns. Mandakini has a sickly daughter, Rachel (Dinuli Mallawarachchi), from a previous romantic encounter abroad. The father of the child (Aruna Lian) arrives in Sri Lanka for the custody of his daughter.

Mandakini has no other option but to turn towards Rajiv for help. Significantly at the same stage Shakya is faced with a dilemma. She who had arranged for Rajiv and her sister to meet realizes that she herself has a romantic attraction towards Rajiv, an attraction so strong that she is willing to break through social morals and family ties to get what she believes is hers.

Though the outward framework of 'Heart FM' is given a light touch the movie reveals the true state of the present society. Selfishness overtakes all barriers and ambitious individuals will take on any obstacle or risk to meet their needs.

This is revealed clearly towards the end as the disturbed mind of Shakya is brought out in the form of a series of episodes during her confession in a hypnotized stage to the psychiatrist. With a light hint of humour the director allows satire to take over as we watch how the green-eyed monster takes control over a once bubbly, happy-go-lucky character - a personification of the unbalanced mind itself.

Another aspect to take note is that the director had let the images do most of the talking. The count down of days pending for Shakya's exam and Rachel's operation is shown by the numerals pasted on the walls and on bedside tables in the character's rooms constantly hinting that the prank played on Rajiv is about to an end and the desperate situation of Mandakini which made her set aside her pride and ask for help from Rajiv and eventually her parents.

These scenes constantly enforced upon the viewer's mind, heightening the tension, may be a form of excusing Mandakini's actions in practically using Rajiv, a man she had just met for a charity promotional programme and trusts as far as to entrust her daughter's safety to him.

A question arises in the viewer's mind when Rajiv who was deeply affected by Shakya's prank fails to recognize her voice after having encountered her sister, Mandakini. Yet again he identifies her voice when the latter calls him from the hospital before things are brought to light.

Cast
 Gayan Wickramathilaka as Rajiv
 Kanchana Mendis as Mandakini aka Mandy
 Sachini Ayendra as Shakya
 Dinuli Mallawaarachchi as Rachell
 Aruna Liyan as Shalitha
 Samanalee Fonseka as Uththara
 Sahan Ranwala as Sagara
 Irangani Serasinghe as Granny
 Tony Ranasinghe as Doctor Sri Vastav
 Chandani Seneviratne Mandy & Shakya's mother
 Mahendra Perera as Heart FM studio manager
 Srimal Wedisinghe as Mandy & Shakya's father
 Pradeep Senanayake as Psychiatrist 
 Rex Kodippili as Child specialist doctor
 Deepani Silva as Granny's servant
 Roshan Ravindra in cameo appearance
 Chathurika Peiris in cameo appearance
 Dasun Pathirana in cameo appearance

Soundtrack

References

2000s Sinhala-language films
2008 drama films
2008 films
Sri Lankan drama films